The 2015–16 Oregon Ducks women's basketball team represented the University of Oregon during the 2015–16 NCAA Division I women's basketball season. The Ducks, led by second year head coach Kelly Graves, played their games at the Matthew Knight Arena and were members of the Pac-12 Conference. They finished the season 24–11, 9–9 in Pac-12 play to finish in sixth place. They lost in the first round of the Pac-12 women's tournament to Arizona. They were invited to the Women's National Invitation Tournament where they defeated Long Beach State, Fresno State and Utah in the first, second and third rounds, UTEP in the quarterfinals before losing to South Dakota in the semifinals.

Roster

Schedule

|-
!colspan=9 style="background:#004F27; color:yellow;"| Exhibition

|-
!colspan=9 style="background:#004F27; color:yellow;"| Non-conference regular season

|-
!colspan=9 style="background:#004F27; color:yellow;"| Pac-12 regular season

|-
!colspan=9 style="background:#004F27;"| 2016 Pac-12 Tournament

|-
!colspan=9 style="background:#004F27;"| WNIT

Rankings
2015–16 NCAA Division I women's basketball rankings

See also
 2015–16 Oregon Ducks men's basketball team

References

Oregon Ducks women's basketball seasons
Oregon
2016 Women's National Invitation Tournament participants
Oregon Ducks
Oregon Ducks